Althaea is the Latin rendering of Greek  Althaia, which may be related to Greek  althos "healing". It may refer to:

Althaea (mythology), the daughter of Thestius and mother of Meleager
Althaea (plant), a genus of up to a dozen species of perennial herbs, native to Europe and western Asia, that includes the marshmallow plant
119 Althaea, an asteroid
Althaea, the name of several nymphs in Greek mythology 
"Shrub Althea", "Shrub Althaea" and "Rose of Althea" are names applied to Hibiscus syriacus, which is South Korea's national flower

Althea, an English variation of the Greek name, may refer to:
Althea, a female first name
Althea, Missouri, a ghost town in the US
Althea Racing, Italian-based motorcycle road racing  
EUFOR Althea, a European Union military operation in Bosnia and Herzegovina
"Althea", a Grateful Dead song
Althea, a fictional pulsar from the science-fiction novel The Hercules Text by Jack McDevitt
, a merchantman launched in 1802 at Calcutta that was wrecked in 1812
U.S. Navy ships of the name include:
, a collier that served during the 1862
, a tugboat that served during the Civil War
, a motorboat built in 1907
Althea (mesh network software), a mesh networking Linux software distribution based on OpenWRT

Altea, a Spanish variation of the Greek name, may refer to:
Altea, a town in Spain